Liushi Shan, also known as Kunlun Goddess, is a mountain in the Kunlun Mountain Range in China. The mountain is located on the border of the Tibet and Xinjiang autonomous regions of China.

See also
 List of mountains by elevation
 List of Ultras of Tibet and East Asia
 List of mountains in China

References

External links
 "Liushi Shan" on Mountain-forecast.com

Mountains of Tibet
Mountains of Xinjiang
Seven-thousanders of the Kunlun